A ballistic missile submarine is a submarine capable of deploying submarine-launched ballistic missiles (SLBMs) with nuclear warheads.  The United States Navy's hull classification symbols for ballistic missile submarines are SSB and SSBN – the SS denotes submarine, the B denotes ballistic missile, and the N denotes that the submarine is nuclear powered. These submarines became a major weapon system in the Cold War because of their nuclear deterrence capability. They can fire missiles thousands of kilometers from their targets, and acoustic quieting makes them difficult to detect (see acoustic signature), thus making them a survivable deterrent in the event of a first strike and a key element of the mutual assured destruction policy of nuclear deterrence. 

The deployment of SSBNs is dominated by the United States and Russia (following the collapse of the Soviet Union). Smaller numbers are in service with France, the United Kingdom, China and India; North Korea is also suspected to have an experimental SSBN.

History 
The first sea-based missile deterrent forces were a small number of conventionally powered cruise missile submarines (SSG) and surface ships fielded by the United States and the Soviet Union in the 1950s, deploying the Regulus I missile and the Soviet P-5 Pyatyorka (SS-N-3 Shaddock), both land attack cruise missiles that could be launched from surfaced submarines. Although these forces served until 1964 and (on the Soviet side) were augmented by the nuclear-powered Project 659 (Echo I class) SSGNs, they were rapidly eclipsed by SLBMs carried by nuclear-powered ballistic missile submarines (SSBNs) beginning in 1960.

SSBN origins
Imperial Japanese Navy s are considered the strategic predecessors to today's ballistic submarines, especially to the Regulus missile program begun about a decade after World War II. 

During World War II, also German researchers developed the A4 (V2), the first ballistic missile. Toward the end of the war, a V2 version was developed at the Peenemünde Army Research Station to be towed in a launch container behind a submarine. Each submarine was to tow up to three of these 36-meter containers, manned by ten soldiers, through the North Sea. Off England, the container would have been brought to the surface and the missiles fired. Prototypes were already being tested on the Baltic coast before the project had to be abandoned in 1945 with the evacuation of Peenemünde. Three containers were already under construction at that time. The commander of the Army Experimental Station, Walter Dornberger, described the project as "not unpromising".

The first nation to field real ballistic missile submarines (SSB) was the Soviet Union, whose first experimental SSB was a converted Project 611 (Zulu IV class) diesel-powered submarine equipped with a single ballistic missile launch tube in its sail. This submarine launched the world's first SLBM, an R-11FM (SS-N-1 Scud-A, naval modification of SS-1 Scud) on 16 September 1955.

Five additional Project V611 and AV611 (Zulu V class) submarines became the world's first operational SSBs with two R-11FM missiles each, entering service in 1956–57. They were followed by a series of 23 specifically designed Project 629 (Golf class) SSBs completed 1958–1962, with three vertical launch tubes incorporated in the sail/fin of each submarine. The initial R-13 (SS-N-4) ballistic missiles could only be launched with the submarine on the surface and the missile raised to the top of the launch tube, but were followed by R-21 (SS-N-5) missiles beginning in 1963, which were launched with the submarine submerged.

The Polaris missile and the first US SSBNs were developed by a Special Project office under Rear Admiral W. F. "Red" Raborn, appointed by Chief of Naval Operations Admiral Arleigh Burke. George Washington was redesigned and rebuilt early in construction from a  fast attack submarine, USS Scorpion, with a  missile compartment welded into the middle. Nuclear power was a crucial advance, allowing a ballistic missile submarine to remain undetected at sea by remaining submerged or occasionally at periscope depth for an entire patrol.

A significant difference between US and Soviet SLBMs was the fuel type; all US SLBMs have been solid fueled while all Soviet SLBMs before 1980 were liquid fueled. The USSR and subsequently Russia deployed 3 different SLBM types with solid fuel (R-31 in 1980, R-39 Rif in 1983, and RSM-56 Bulava in 2018). However, these did not replace liquid fuel SLBM in service, and new liquid fuel SLBM were developed and introduced (R-29RM introduced in 1986, R-29RMU introduced in 2007) after deployment of the R-31 and R-39. 
With more missiles on one US SSBN than on five Golf-class boats, the Soviets rapidly fell behind in sea-based deterrent capability. The Soviets were only a year behind the US with their first SSBN, the ill-fated K-19 of Project 658 (Hotel class), commissioned in November 1960. However, this class carried the same three-missile armament as the Golfs. The first Soviet SSBN with 16 missiles was the Project 667A (Yankee class), the first of which entered service in 1967, by which time the US had commissioned 41 SSBNs, nicknamed the "41 for Freedom".

The United Kingdom's first SSBN was the Resolution class of four submarines built for the Royal Navy as part of the UK Polaris programme. After commissioning in 1967, a period of sea trials followed, culminating in the test firing of a Polaris missile from the USAF Eastern Test Range off Cape Kennedy in February 1968. Resolution commenced her first operational patrol in June 1968.

Deployment and further development 
The short range of the early SLBMs dictated basing and deployment locations. By the late 1960s the UGM-27 Polaris A-3 missile was deployed on all US and UK SSBNs. The A-3 also had three warheads that landed in a pattern around a single target.

The US was much more fortunate in its basing arrangements than the Soviets. Thanks to NATO and the US possession of Guam, US SSBNs were permanently forward deployed at Advanced Refit Sites in Holy Loch, Scotland; Rota, Spain; and Guam by the middle 1960s, resulting in short transit times to patrol areas near the Soviet Union. With two rotating crews per SSBN, about one-third of the total US force could be in a patrol area at any time. The Soviet bases, in the Murmansk area for the Atlantic and the Petropavlovsk-Kamchatsky area for the Pacific, required their SSBNs to make a long transit (through NATO-monitored waters in the Atlantic) to their mid-ocean patrol areas to hold the Continental United States (CONUS) at risk.

That resulted in only a small percentage of the Soviet force occupying patrol areas at any time and was a great motivation for longer-range Soviet SLBMs, which would allow them to patrol close to their bases in areas sometimes referred to as "deep bastions". The missiles were the R-29 Vysota series (SS-N-8, SS-N-18, SS-N-23), equipped on Projects 667B, 667BD, 667BDR, and 667BDRM (Delta I through Delta IV classes). A total of 43 Delta-class boats of all types entered service 1972–1990, with the SS-N-18 on the Delta III class and the R-29RM Shtil (SS-N-23) on the Delta IV class. The new missiles had increased range and eventually Multiple Independently Targeted Re-entry Vehicles (MIRV), multiple warheads that could each hit a different target.

The Delta I class had 12 missiles each; the others have 16 missiles each. All Deltas have a tall superstructure (aka casing) to accommodate their large liquid-fueled missiles.

Poseidon and Trident I 
Although the US did not commission any new SSBNs from 1967 through 1981, they did introduce two new SLBMs. Thirty-one of the 41 original US SSBNs were built with larger diameter launch tubes with future missiles in mind. In the early 1970s the Poseidon (C-3) missile entered service, and those 31 SSBNs were backfitted with it. Poseidon offered a massive MIRV capability of up to 14 warheads per missile. Like the Soviets, the US also desired a longer-range missile that would allow SSBNs to be based in CONUS. In the late 1970s the Trident I (C-4) missile was backfitted to 12 of the Poseidon-equipped submarines. The SSBN facilities of the base at Rota, Spain were disestablished and the Naval Submarine Base King's Bay in Georgia was built for the Trident I-equipped force.

Trident and Typhoon submarines 

Both the United States and the Soviet Union commissioned larger SSBNs designed for new missiles in 1981. The entire class was converted to use Trident II by the early 2000s. When the  commenced sea trials in 1980, two US  SSBNs had their missiles removed to comply with SALT treaty requirements; the remaining eight were converted to attack submarines (SSN) by the end of 1982. These were all in the Pacific, and the Guam SSBN base was disestablished; the first several Ohio-class boats used new Trident facilities at Naval Submarine Base Bangor, Washington. Eighteen Ohio-class boats were commissioned by 1997, four of which were converted as cruise missile submarines (SSGN) in the 2000s to comply with START I treaty requirements. 

The Soviet large SSBN was the Project 941 Akula, more famously known as the Typhoon class (and not to be confused with the Project 971 Shchuka attack submarine, called "Akula" by NATO). The Typhoons were the largest submarines ever built at 48,000 tons submerged. They were armed with 20 of the new R-39 Rif (SS-N-20) missiles. Six Typhoons were commissioned 1981–1989.

The United Kingdom commissioned the in 1985, to carry the Trident II missile.

Post-Cold War
With the collapse of the Soviet Union and the end of the Cold War in 1991, construction of new SSBNs by Russia was put on hold for over 10 years and was slowed in the United States. Additionally the US rapidly decommissioned its 31 older remaining SSBNs, with a few converted to other roles, and the base at Holy Loch in Scotland was disestablished. Most of the former Soviet SSBN force was gradually scrapped under the provisions of the Nunn–Lugar Cooperative Threat Reduction agreement through 2012.

The Russian SSBN force then stood at six Delta IVs, three Delta IIIs, and a lone Typhoon used as a testbed for new missiles (the R-39s unique to the Typhoons were reportedly scrapped in 2012). Upgraded missiles such as the R-29RMU Sineva (SS-N-23 Sineva) were developed for the Deltas. In 2013 the Russians commissioned the first , also called the Dolgorukiy class after the lead vessel. By 2015 two others had entered service. The US  is set to replace the Ohio-class, with construction beginning in 2020.

In 2009, India launched the first of its indigenously-built s. North Korea test-fired ballistic missiles from submarines in 2021 and 2022.

Purpose

Ballistic missile submarines differ in purpose from attack submarines and cruise missile submarines. Attack submarines specialize in combat with other vessels (including enemy submarines and merchant shipping), and cruise missile submarines are designed to attack large warships and tactical targets on land. However, the primary mission of the ballistic missile is nuclear deterrence. They serve as the third leg of the nuclear triad in countries that also operate nuclear-armed land based missiles and aircraft. Accordingly, the mission profile of a ballistic missile submarine concentrates on remaining undetected, rather than aggressively pursuing other vessels.

Ballistic missile submarines are designed for stealth to avoid detection at all costs, and that makes nuclear power, allowing almost the entire patrol to be conducted submerged, very important. They also use many sound-reducing design features, such as anechoic tiles on their hull surfaces, carefully designed propulsion systems, and machinery mounted on vibration-damping mounts. The invisibility and mobility of SSBNs offer a reliable means of deterrence against an attack (by maintaining the threat of a second strike), as well as a potential surprise first strike capability.

Armament 

In most cases, SSBNs generally resemble attack subs of the same generation, with extra length to accommodate SLBMs, such as the Russian R-29 (SS-N-23) or the NATO-fielded and American-manufactured Polaris, Poseidon, and Trident-II missiles. Missiles are launched upwards with an initial velocity sufficient for them to pop above the surface, at which point their rocket motors fire, beginning the characteristic parabolic climb-from-launch of a ballistic missile. Compressed air ejection, later replaced by gas-steam ejection, was developed by Captain Harry Jackson of Rear Admiral Raborn's Special Project Office when a proposed missile elevator proved too complex.

Terminology

United States and United Kingdom 
SSBN is the US Navy hull classification symbol for a nuclear-powered, ballistic missile-carrying submarine. The SS denotes "submarine" or "submersible", the B denotes "ballistic missile," and the N denotes "nuclear powered."   The designation SSBN is also used throughout NATO under STANAG 1166.

In the US Navy, SSBNs are sometimes called Fleet Ballistic Missile submarines, or FBMs. In US naval slang, ballistic missile submarines are called boomers. In the UK, they are known as bombers. In both cases, SSBN submarines operate on a two-crew concept, with two complete crews – including two captains – called Gold and Blue in the United States, Starboard and Port in the United Kingdom.

France 
The French Navy commissioned its first ballistic missile submarines as SNLE, for Sous-marin Nucléaire Lanceur d'Engins (lit. "nuclear-powered device-launching submarines"). The more recent  is referred to as SNLE-NG (Nouvelle Génération, "New Generation"). The two crews used to maximise the availability time of the boats are called "blue" and "red" crews.

Soviet Union and Russian Federation 
The Soviets called this type of ship RPKSN (lit. "Strategic Purpose Underwater Missile Cruiser"). Another designation used was PLARB(«ПЛАРБ» – подводная лодка атомная с баллистическими ракетами, which translates as "Nuclear Submarine with Ballistic Missiles"). This designation was applied to smaller submarines such as the Delta class. After a peak in 1984 (following Able Archer 83), Russian SSBN deterrence patrols have declined to the point where there is less than one patrol per sub each year and at best one sub on patrol at any time. Hence the Russians do not use multiple crews per boat.

India 
India classifies this type of a submarine as a Strategic Strike Nuclear Submarine.

Active classes 

 France
  – 4 in service
 China
Type 092 submarine – 1 in service
Type 094 submarine – 6 in service.
 India
 – 2 in service.
 North Korea (suspected)
 – 1 active
 Russia
 – 6 in service.
Delta class – 5 Delta IV class i service (3 additional Delta III/IV in special operations or SSN role).
 United Kingdom
 – 4 in service
 United States
 – 14 in service (4 others have been converted into cruise missile submarines).

Classes under development
 France
 SNLE 3G – 4 planned
 China
Type 096
 India
Arihant class – 2 under construction
 – 3 planned
 United Kingdom
  2 under construction, 4 planned
 United States
  - 12 planned

Retired classes
  France
 

 / Soviet Union / Russia
 Zulu V class (with a single Zulu IV prototype) (diesel powered)
 Golf I class (diesel powered)
 Golf II class (diesel powered)
 Hotel I class
 Hotel II class
 Yankee class
 Yankee II class
 Delta I class
 Delta II class
 

  United Kingdom
 

  United States
 
 
 
 
 
 These five classes are collectively referred to as "41 for Freedom".

Accidents

On 4 February 2009, the British  and the French  collided in the Atlantic. Vanguard returned to Faslane in Scotland, under her own power, and Triomphant to Île Longue in Brittany.

See also 

 List of submarine classes in service

References

Citations

Sources 

 
 
 Miller, David; Jordan, John: Moderne Unterseeboote. Stocker Schmid AG, Zürich 1987, 1999 (2. Auflage). .
 Polmar, Norman; Noot, Jurrien: Submarines of the Russian and Soviet Navies, 1718–1990. Naval Institute Press, Annapolis, 1991. .
 Polmar, Norman; Moore, K.J. (2004). Cold War Submarines: The Design and Construction of U.S. and Soviet Submarines, 1945–2001. Dulles, VA: Potomac Books. .